The 2022–23 Brown Bears Men's ice hockey season was the 105th season of play for the program and the 61st in the ECAC Hockey conference. The Bears represented Brown University and were coached by Brendan Whittet, in his 13th season.

Season
Brown had a slow start to the season, winning just once in their first eight games. While the offense was still trying to figure things out, the team had settled on Mathieu Caron as their starting goaltender. After Thanksgiving the team's results began to improve and Brown posted its first win over a ranked team in 4 years.

The Bears were hit and miss over the next few months but were able to win twice more against top-20 teams, including a very strong performance over Merrimack. After the team's win over Harvard, the Bears were just 3 games under .500 and had a chance to post just their second winning season in the last decade. Unfortunately, during the off week, Caron suffered an injury and missed six games. The team turned to freshman Jacob Zacharewicz, but he wasn't quite ready to be the starter. After allowing 6 goals in each of his first two games he settled into the role but the Bears ended up losing 5 of those contests.

When Caron returned at the end of the regular season, he didn't look like the same goaltender and couldn't stop Brown from finishing on a 1–6–1 run. The losses caused the Bears to drop to 11th in the conference and set them up against Clarkson in the first round. Caron looked much better after a full week of practice and weathered a barrage of shots, but Brown's offense gave him no support. The Bears could only manage 1 goal and were swiftly knocked out of the postseason.

Departures

Recruiting

Roster

As of July 18, 2022.

|}

Standings

Schedule and results

|-
!colspan=12 style=";" | Regular Season

|-
!colspan=12 style=";" |

Scoring statistics

Goaltending statistics

Rankings

Note: USCHO did not release a poll in weeks 1, 13, or 26.

References

2022-23
Brown
Brown
Brown
Brown